Catocala catei is a moth in the family Erebidae first described by Friedrich Weisert in 1998. It is found in Iran.

References

catei
Moths described in 1998
Moths of Asia